The  Cones Series is a series of 87 abstract paintings by Turkish artist Burhan Doğançay, executed between 1986 and 1995 and featuring cones.

In almost all of the paintings in the series the collage and fumage techniques are applied.

External links
 Gallery of Cones Series

Painting series
1980s paintings
1990s paintings